Hans Lindahl Falck (19 March 1863 – 1937) was a Norwegian ship-owner and politician.

He was born in Stavanger as a son of Thomas Scheen Falck, Sr. (1829–1889) and Anna Lindahl (1842–1921). He was a brother of consul Christian Fredrik Falck. In 1890 he married Karen Johanne Poulsson. Their son Thomas Scheen Falck, Jr. became a notable ship-owner.

Falck took commercial education in Germany, England, France and the United States. He then started a career in the family company Ths. S. Falck in 1888, and advanced to co-owner in 1889.

Falck was elected as a deputy representative to the Parliament of Norway from Stavanger og Haugesund during the term 1895–1897. He was a member of Stavanger city council for 25 years, serving as mayor for eight years. From 1890 to 1914 he also served as a consul for the German Empire. He was decorated as a Knight, First Class of the Order of St. Olav and a Knight, Fourth Class of the Order of the Red Eagle.

References

1863 births
1937 deaths
Norwegian businesspeople in shipping
Politicians from Stavanger
Mayors of places in Rogaland
Deputy members of the Storting